Robert Lamb (born 17 January 1955) is a former Australian rules football player who played in the VFL between 1973 and 1978 for the Richmond Football Club and in 1979 for the South Melbourne Football Club.

Lamb is the only player in Richmond history to have kicked 8 or more goals in a game at Senior, Reserve and Under 19 levels. Lamb also kicked a total of 8 goals at senior level in 1976, against former rivals Collingwood, gaining maximum brownlow votes for being award best player on field. Lamb also made way for team mate, Royce Hart in the 1973 premiership side to allow Richmond to achieve the holy grail, and was hailed in the press by then Richmond coach Tom Hafey for his courageous efforts and strong sense of team-work, and maturity for the then 18-year-old. 

During the second quarter of a mid-season match against Footscray in 1978, Lamb courageously backed into the path of Bulldog backman Alby Smedts, marking the ball just before he was crashed to the ground. Bloodied and battered, Lamb staggered to his feet and took his kick. Eventually, he was led off the field and subsequent X-rays revealed he had a broken jaw.   

A talented all-round cricketer, Lamb played District Cricket with the Melbourne Cricket Club, including being a member of their 1975/76 Premiership side. 

He later pursued other career options, and become a qualified high school teacher.  He became a high school principal at a number of schools, and ultimately, a mentor of principals for the education department of Victoria.

References 
 Hogan P: The Tigers Of Old, Richmond FC, Melbourne 1996

1955 births
Living people
Richmond Football Club players
Sydney Swans players
Australian rules footballers from Victoria (Australia)
Melbourne Cricket Club cricketers
People educated at Camberwell Grammar School
Cricketers from Victoria (Australia)
Australian schoolteachers